DMAA may refer to 
Methylhexanamine, also known as 1,3-dimethylamylamine, a dietary supplement 
DMAA: The Care Continuum Alliance, a United States health industry trade association
Delugan Meissl Associated Architects